"Mother and Child Reunion" is a song by the American singer-songwriter Paul Simon. It was the lead single from his second studio album, Paul Simon (1972), released on Columbia Records.

Background
It was at the time one of the few songs by a non-Jamaican musician to use prominent elements of reggae. Simon was a fan of reggae music, and he listened to artists such as Jimmy Cliff, Desmond Dekker, and Byron Lee; he wanted to go to Kingston, Jamaica to record the song, as that was where Cliff had recorded his antiwar song "Vietnam" in 1970. 

The title has its origin in a chicken-and-egg dish called "Mother and Child Reunion" that Simon saw on a Chinese restaurant's menu. The song's lyrics were inspired by a pet dog that was run over and killed. It was the first death Simon personally experienced, and he began to wonder how he would react if the same happened to his first wife, Peggy Harper. "Somehow there was a connection between this death and Peggy and it was like Heaven, I don't know what the connection was," Simon told Rolling Stone in 1972.

Production
The song was recorded at Dynamic Sounds Studios at Torrington Bridge in Kingston, Jamaica, with Jimmy Cliff's backing group. Guitarist Huks ("Hux") Brown and bass guitarist Jackie Jackson were also long-time members of  Toots & the Maytals.  Cissy Houston sang background vocals on the recording. The song was recorded before writing lyrics, which was unusual for Simon. He had previously hoped to make "Why Don't You Write Me" - a song recorded with Art Garfunkel on Bridge over Troubled Water - sound like a Jamaican song, but felt it ended up sounding like a "bad imitation." Simon was instructed by the musicians on the differences among reggae, ska, and bluebeat. He felt awkward at first because he was "the only white guy there and I was American." Simon later overdubbed piano and vocals to the track back in New York.

Personnel
Paul Simon – lead vocals
Hux Brown – lead guitar
Wallace Wilson – rhythm guitar
Jackie Jackson – bass guitar
Larry Knechtel – piano
Neville Hinds – organ
Winston Grennan – drums
Denzil Laing – percussion
Cissy Houston, Von Eva Sims, Renelle Stafford, Deirdre Tuck – backing vocals

Chart history
"Mother and Child Reunion" was released as a single on February 5, 1972, reaching No. 1 in South Africa, No. 4 on the US Billboard Hot 100 chart, and No. 5 on the UK Singles Chart. Billboard ranked it as the No. 57 song for 1972.

Weekly charts

Year-end charts

Other renditions by Simon
Simon performed the song on his 1974 live album Paul Simon in Concert: Live Rhymin'.

Covers
Euro-Caribbean vocal group Boney M. recorded a cover of "Mother and Child Reunion" for their 1984 album Christmas with Boney M. However, the album was released only in South Africa. Boney M. producer and vocalist Frank Farian decided to add in other notable musicians to the song, and re-released it in 1985 as a charity single for aid to Ethiopia, in the spirit of earlier charity singles "Do They Know It's Christmas?" and "We Are the World". This single reached the top 10 in several European countries. The song was credited to Frank Farian Corporation, a group that would go on to release albums as the supergroup Far Corporation. The single was also included as a bonus track on the 2007 re-release of Boney M.'s 1985 album Eye Dance.

Johnny Rivers covered the song on his 1972 album L.A. Reggae.

Randy California covered the song on his 1972 album Kapt. Kopter and the (Fabulous) Twirly Birds. 

Another cover, performed by Wailing Souls, was featured in the second season of Green Eggs and Ham.

Notes

References

Sources

Further reading

Lacitis, Erik (October 7, 1986). "Dig It: 254 Nonstop Hits! (This Offer is Not Available in Many Stores)," The Seattle Times.

Paul Simon songs
1972 singles
Songs written by Paul Simon
Song recordings produced by Roy Halee
Song recordings produced by Paul Simon
Columbia Records singles
Songs inspired by deaths
1972 songs
Number-one singles in South Africa
American reggae songs